The Edge Hill Short Story Prize is a short-story contest held annually by Edge Hill University.

Background
The concept for the prize was developed by Professor Ailsa Cox following a 2006 short-story conference at Edge Hill. Candidates must be born or normally reside in the British Isles (including Ireland), making the prize the only United Kingdom award to recognize a single author, published short-story collection.

The prize has three categories: the main literary award of £10,000, the Reader's Prize award (judged by the BA Creative Writing students) of £1,000, and the MA Creative Writing rising talents award of £500.
Rodge Glass, previously senior lecturer in creative writing at Edge Hill, edited an anthology of selected stories from winners and shortlisted authors to celebrate the award's first ten years. Titled Head Land: 10 Years of the Edge Hill Short Story Prize, it was published in 2017.

Judging
Each year, the judging panel consists of three individuals who are supporters of the short story through writing or the creative industries, or have connections with the university.

Winners
Colm Toibin was the first winner of the Edge Hill Short Story Prize in 2007. His winning collection, Mothers and Sons, explores the family relationships of several individuals during significant times in their lives. The following year Claire Keegan won the prize with her collection entitled Walk the Blue Fields. The collection's stories illustrate the yearning of the human heart against the backdrop of a nation wrestling with its past. The 2009 prize was awarded to Chris Beckett for The Turing Test. This science fiction collection captures readers' attention with tales about robots, alien planets, genetic manipulation, virtual reality, and artificial intelligence. Jeremy Dyson won the 2010 prize for his third short story collection The Cranes that Build the Cranes. A compilation of ghoulish stories, The Cranes that Build the Cranes is full of black humour and dark stories that received significant praise from critics. In 2011 judges awarded the prize to Professor Graham Mort for his collection entitled Touch. The stories in Touch are set in a variety of backgrounds including Africa, France, and northern England, and they convey an understanding and respect of the natural world and human relationships. Sarah Hall's The Beautiful Indifference won the prize in 2012. The collection includes erotic and disarming stories that span across centuries and diverse landscapes, all emphasizing the importance of survivalism. Dark Lies the Island by Kevin Barry was awarded the prize in 2013. This collection explores the tragedies and comedies of everyday life, and includes moving tales of misspent love and crimes gone wrong. The 2014 prize was given to John Burnside for his collection entitled Something Like Happy. Stories in Something Like Happy are often set in coastal towns during the winter, and include tales of menace, violence, and hallucinations. The 2015 prize was awarded to Professor Kirsty Gunn for Infidelities. The collection centres on stories of infidelity and includes tales of lust, love, resentment, and regret.

Award ceremonies
Winning authors are announced and honoured at an award ceremony each year. Furthermore, Edge Hill University hosts a public reading, during which the prize recipient reads from the winning collection.

Citations

Awards established in 2007
2007 establishments in England
British literary awards
Short story awards
Edge Hill University